Andrew Kennedy Irvine (born 14 June 1942) is an Irish folk musician, singer-songwriter, and a founding member of Sweeney's Men, Planxty, Patrick Street, Mozaik, LAPD and Usher's Island. He also featured in duos, with Dónal Lunny, Paul Brady, Mick Hanly, Dick Gaughan, Rens van der Zalm, and Luke Plumb. Irvine plays the mandolin, mandola, bouzouki, harmonica, and hurdy-gurdy.

He has been influential in folk music for over six decades, during which he recorded a large repertoire of songs and tunes he assembled from books, old recordings and  rooted in the Irish, English, Scottish, Eastern European, Australian and American old-time and folk traditions.

As a child actor, Irvine honed his performing talent from an early age and learned the classical guitar. He switched to folk music after discovering Woody Guthrie, also adopting the latter's other instruments: harmonica and mandolin. While extending Guthrie's guitar picking technique to the mandolin, he further developed his playing of this instrument—and, later, of the mandola and the bouzouki—into a decorative, harmonic style, and embraced the modes and rhythms of Bulgarian folk music.

Along with Johnny Moynihan and Dónal Lunny, Irvine is one of the pioneers who adapted the Greek bouzouki—with a new tuning—into an Irish instrument. He contributed to advancing the design of his instruments in co-operation with English luthier Stefan Sobell, and he sometimes plays a hurdy-gurdy made for him in 1972 by Peter Abnett, another English luthier.

Although touring mainly as a soloist, Irvine has also enjoyed great success in pursuing collaborations through many projects that have influenced contemporary folk music. He continues to tour and perform extensively in Ireland, Great Britain, Europe, North and South America, Japan, Australia and New Zealand. In October 2018, he received the first Lifetime Achievement Award bestowed at RTÉ Radio 1's inaugural Folk Music Awards.

Early life and acting career
Andy Irvine was born in St John's Wood, northwest London on 14 June 1942 to an Irish mother from Lisburn, County Antrim, and a Scottish father from Glasgow. His mother had been a musical comedy actress who performed under the stage name of Felice Lascelles and Irvine would later say that "she may have given up the stage, but she never stopped acting!". At the age of three-and-a-half, Irvine started attending boarding school, where he would later play football during the winter season, rugby during the spring season, and cricket during the summer season, all of which fostered his lifelong passion for team sports.

As a child, Irvine was given opportunities to appear on stage, TV and in films. In the summer holidays of 1950, when he was eight years old, his first role was to play Jimmy in the film A Tale of Five Cities (released as A Tale of Five Women in the US). At thirteen, he starred as Nokie (short for Pinocchio) in the ITV children's series Round at the Redways and joined a school for child actors. He made his stage debut in the Grand Theatre in Wolverhampton and, at fourteen, received rave reviews for his performance as Morgan in the ITV Television Playhouse drama The Magpies, adapted from a Henry James short story. The same year, he was Eric Brandt in Escape to Happiness, for the Armchair Theatre programme and also played John Logie Baird as a boy in the film A Voice in Vision. In early 1958, Irvine featured as Archie Almond in five episodes of Run to Earth. In June that year, he played Lord Heybrook in French Without Tears for the Saturday Playhouse TV series and, soon after, was one of the 'Pygmies' in Brouhaha, with Peter Sellers as the Sultan. Irvine then played Raymond opposite Laurence Harvey in Room at the Top and, although his scene was cut from the final release, he still appears briefly in the film, handing a bottle of champagne to Harvey during a wedding scene. In late 1959, he featured as Lanky Graham in Ask for King Billy and, in early 1960, he played a schoolboy in A Holiday Abroad for ITV Television Playhouse. Later that year, at eighteen, Irvine performed as Dan in three episodes of Sheep's Clothing, after which he was offered a two-year contract with the BBC's Repertory company ('The Rep'), where he befriended the poet Louis MacNeice who worked there as a writer for over twenty years. As Irvine recalled much later: 

However, Irvine would give up acting in his early twenties, after moving to Dublin at the end of his time with the 'Rep'.

Influences

Music
Irvine loved music from the earliest time he could remember. His mother had a stack of old, cracked 78s that he used to play on a wind-up gramophone. "They were mainly songs from long forgotten musical comedies but I wish I had them now." At thirteen, he studied classical guitar for two years, initially with Julian Bream and later under one of Bream's pupils but switched to folk music after discovering Woody Guthrie during the Skiffle boom of the 1950s.

Guthrie was to become an enduring influence on his music, on his choice of additional instruments (mandolin and harmonica) and general outlook on life. In a 1985 interview, Irvine expanded on how, in the mid-1950s, he discovered Woody Guthrie through Lonnie Donegan's recordings on the EPs Backstairs Session and Skiffle Session:

In May 1959, Irvine began frequenting the Ballads and Blues Club—started at the Princess Louise pub in High Holborn by Ewan MacColl in 1957—which, by September 1959, had moved to 2, Soho Square under the sole leadership of Malcolm Nixon. American folk musicians who had been closely associated with Guthrie would perform there: Ramblin' Jack Elliott, Derroll Adams and Cisco Houston; Irvine befriended all three of them, particularly Elliott, who taught him how to play the harmonica in Guthrie's style:

After locating Guthrie at Greystone Park Psychiatric Hospital in Morristown, New Jersey, Irvine began corresponding with Sid Gleason who, with her husband Bob, would take Guthrie out of hospital and entertain him at weekends. She was the first person to call him "Andy", and thereafter remained a conduit between him and Guthrie.

During 1959, Irvine and Elliott also recorded audio tapes to send Guthrie and, after recording one of Guthrie's songs, Elliott exclaimed: "Andy, you sound more like Woody than I do!", just as Guthrie had once said to Elliott: "Jack, you sound more like me than I do!". However, Irvine's dream to join Guthrie in the States eventually faded when his mother died in 1961.

In 1991, Irvine wrote his tribute song to Woody Guthrie: "Never Tire of the Road", first released on the solo album Rude Awakening. He recorded it again for the album Rain on the Roof, released in 1996, after including another verse plus the chorus from a song Guthrie recorded in March 1944: "You Fascists Are Bound to Lose".

In a 2000 interview, Irvine stated: "I never met Woody, but I corresponded with him in hospital. [...] The kind of values that Woody represented are one of my great passions."

Social justice
Irvine is a card-carrying member of the Industrial Workers of the World (the 'Wobblies'), with an avowed commitment to social justice. For example, by championing the life, social activism and energetic organising leadership of Mary Harris Jones ('Mother Jones') about whom he wrote a song, "The Spirit of Mother Jones", which he recorded and released on his 2010 album Abocurragh. On 1 August 2012, Irvine performed in Shandon, County Cork, for the inaugural Mother Jones Festival which celebrated the 175th Anniversary of the birth of Mary Harris; he performed at the Festival again on 1 August 2013.

Like other artists contracted to perform at Féile Iorrais (a community festival in Erris) in August 2007, Irvine was disgusted to learn that Royal Dutch Shell were partly sponsoring the events. Shell's plans for the Corrib gas project have been the subject of controversy in County Mayo. Irvine pledged to donate part of his fee to the Shell to Sea campaign.

Music career

1960s: Dublin, Sweeney's Men, Eastern Europe

Move to Dublin and transition from acting to folk music
In 1962, when his two-year contract with the BBC's 'Rep' ended, Irvine moved to Dublin and continued earning a living as an actor for a while, playing at The Olympia, The Gaiety, The Gate and The Eblana. He also performed at the Pike Theatre, where he played the role of Jerry as one of only two actors in Edward Albee's The Zoo Story, and where he also appeared as Tethra (the Irish god of war) in Moytura by Pádraic Colum, during the Dublin Theatre Festival in 1963. In late 1963, he had a part in a few episodes of Down at Flannery's, a forerunner of the popular RTÉ soapTolka Row in which he appeared for five episodes in the role of Jim "Beardie" Toomey, the boyfriend of Laurie Morton's character, Peggy Kinnear. One of his last acting performances was at the Olympia Theatre on 28 September 1964 as Sir Peregrine in Sir Buccaneer, a musical by G.P. Gallivan.

However, he very quickly noticed that a burgeoning folk scene was emerging, centred around the Baggot Street–Merrion quarter of Dublin's city centre. "As soon as I found my feet there, I thought, 'That's it, goodbye acting!. After discovering Irish music through Séamus Ennis on Peter Kennedy's BBC programme As I Roved Out and through Ciarán Mac Mathúna on Raidió Éireann, Irvine studiously spent many hours at the National Library, scouring old songbooks like the Child Ballads and Sam Henry's Songs of the People, as well as A.L. Lloyd's Penguin Book of English Folk Songs. He also drew inspiration from Ewan MacColl, notably the songs he wrote for his radio-ballads.

Gravitating around Paddy and Maureen O'Donoghue's Pub, Irvine met like-minded people such as Ronnie Drew, Luke Kelly and Barney McKenna, who would later form The Dubliners. Decades later, he recorded "O'Donoghue's"—released on the album Changing Trains (2004)—a song of eleven verses in which he vividly recalls these happy times, naming many of the people who were part of his transition from actor to folk musician.

Sweeney's Men – Sweeney's Men
One of these people was Johnny Moynihan, with whom he created a musical partnership which turned into Sweeney's Men in the summer of 1966, after the addition of 'Galway Joe' Dolan. To quote Colin Irwin: "They merged the familiar American folk style so popular in the early sixties with a distinctively home-grown Irish flavour; it was not Irish music but it was real and exciting, it had verve, imagination and style." A distinctive aspect of the Sweeney's Men sound was Moynihan's introduction of the bouzouki—originally a Greek instrument—into Irish music, albeit with a different tuning: GDAD' (one octave lower than the open-tuned mandolin), instead of the modern Greek tuning of CFAD'.

In 1996, Irvine wrote:

While in the process of adopting the itinerant lifestyle of a musician, Irvine developed a taste for travel, initially within Ireland. The first time he witnessed Willie Clancy playing his uilleann pipes was at a fleadh in Miltown Malbay in the summer of 1963, and he followed the festival trail in Ireland during the summers of 1964, 1965 and 1966. Irvine also returned regularly to London for short stays of a few weeks or months, and ventured further afield across Europe, hitch-hiking to Munich, Vienna and Rome in the autumn of 1965. In early 1966, he was playing the clubs in Denmark with Éamonn O'Doherty. In June 1966, Irvine and Dolan played five nights a week as a duo at the Enda Hotel in Galway and Moynihan would join them at weekends, since he was still working as a draughtsman in Roscommon. It was at this time that Dolan suggested the band's name, after reading Flann O'Brien's comic novel At Swim-Two-Birds, which depicts the mad, anti-religious, tree-leaping pagan King Sweeney of Antrim.

In a 2005 interview, Irvine added:

The trio recorded their first single "Old Maid in the Garrett"/"The Derby Ram" for Pye Records at Eamonn Andrews Studios in the spring of 1967. The week the single was in the Irish charts, Dolan departed for Israel and the Six-Day War "but it took him a year to get down there", and was replaced by Terry Woods – later of Steeleye Span and The Pogues.

In early 1968, the new line-up recorded the eponymous album, Sweeney's Men, produced by Bill Leader at Livingston Studios, Barnet. In addition to playing either guitar, mandolin or harmonica on most tracks, Irvine contributed four songs: "Sally Brown", "Willy O' Winsbury", "Dance to Your Daddy", and "Reynard The Fox".

He also played Moynihan's bouzouki—for the first time on a recording—on the track "Johnston".

Irvine wrote his first song, "West Coast of Clare", in the late summer of 1968, around the time Sweeney's Men were playing one of their last shows in Quilty, County Clare. "It was actually written with a Danish girl called Birte in mind, but [...] it very quickly became a memory of great times in Clare. I started the song in County Clare and finished it in Ljubljana, Yugoslavia, in August or September 1968."

Irvine left Sweeney's Men after a final performance at Liberty Hall in Dublin, where he played the first half of the set with Moynihan and Woods before making way for his replacement, Henry McCullough, who played the second half.

Discovering Eastern Europe and Bulgarian folk music
In the late summer of 1968, Irvine and his first wife Muriel headed off to Eastern Europe and the Balkans.

He later wrote several songs about his experiences there: 
"Time Will Cure Me", which he recorded in 1973 with Planxty on the album The Well Below the Valley;
"Băneasă's Green Glade", which he recorded in 1974 with Planxty on the album Cold Blow and the Rainy Night; 
"Autumn Gold", which he recorded in 1976 with Paul Brady on their duo album, Andy Irvine/Paul Brady and 
"Rainy Sundays", which he recorded in 1980 on his debut solo album, Rainy Sundays... Windy Dreams.

During a series of hitch-hiking journeys across Slovenia, Serbia, Bulgaria and Romania, Irvine discovered the region's folk music styles and was particularly attracted to the Bulgarian tradition. In a 1992 interview, he related the moment he first heard Bulgarian folk music:

This lasting fascination with Bulgarian folk music would inform several of his later projects—first with Planxty, then in the recording of his first solo album (1980) and of the album East Wind (1992), and also with the creation of two multicultural, similarly named bands: Mosaic (1984–85) and Mozaik (2002–present day). In turn, Irvine's integration of characteristic elements of Bulgarian folk music into his playing, such as asymmetric rhythms, would also have a profound influence on the sound of contemporary Irish music, including—via Bill Whelan—the original Riverdance score.

He also went to Thessaloniki, a Greek-Macedonian town near the Bulgarian border, to buy a bouzouki: 

While in Ljubljana, he met Rens van der Zalm, a young, classically trained violinist from the Netherlands who also played guitar, mandolin, piano, accordion and tin whistle, and who was one of the founders of the Dutch folk group Fungus. They would later join forces in several of Irvine's projects.

When he returned to Dublin in the autumn of 1969, Sweeney's Men—now reduced to Moynihan and Woods—was breaking up and Irvine played a final gig with them at Nottingham University in October or November 1969.

1970s: Duo with Dónal Lunny, Prosperous, Planxty, duos with Paul Brady and Mick Hanly

Duo with Dónal Lunny – "The Blacksmith"
After the demise of Sweeney's Men, a new Irish-English folk super-group was almost formed in 1970, with Irvine, Moynihan, Woods and his wife Gay, plus ex-Fairport Convention Ashley Hutchings joining on bass guitar, but this never happened.

For a while, Irvine performed regularly at Slattery's Pub on Capel Street. Then, he met Dónal Lunny, with whom he formed a duo after an initial gig at a party for the Irish-Soviet Union Friendship conference organised by Seán Mac Réamoinn:

Says Leagues O'Toole: "This partnership also furthered the presence of the bouzouki in Irish music. Just as Johnny Moynihan had introduced the instrument to Andy Irvine, he in turn passed it on to Dónal Lunny". As Lunny himself recalled:

In a 2015 interview, Irvine added his recollection of that event: 

They also created their own club night, downstairs at Slattery's Pub, which they called 'The Mug's Gig'. This featured Irvine and Lunny, and guest performers such as Ronnie Drew, Mellow Candle, and the group Supply, Demand & Curve. Clodagh Simonds, who co-founded Mellow Candle with Alison O'Donnell in 1963, recalls:

By that time, Irvine had put together his own version of "The Blacksmith", followed by a self-penned coda—in the Bulgarian rhythm of —which would later be given the title of "Blacksmithereens" by Christy Moore, at a Planxty concert in 1973.

Christy Moore – Prosperous
Before too long, Irvine and Lunny participated in a project that would lead to their big break. Moore, who had moved to England during the National Bank Strike of 1966, had become an established musician in the English folk music scene and even recorded his first album (Paddy on the Road) there, in 1969, at the Sound Techniques studio in Chelsea.

After that, he decided to record his second album in Ireland and his guest musicians included Irvine, Lunny, and uilleann piper Liam O'Flynn. The album, Prosperous, was recorded by Bill Leader who had brought his mobile recording unit (a Revox tape machine and two microphones) to Ireland in the summer of 1971. Rehearsals took place at Irvine's flat in Dublin and the recordings were made in Prosperous, County Kildare, down in the cellar of Downings House, owned by Moore's sister and brother-in-law, Anne and Davoc Rynne.

In his annotated book of songs, first published in 2000, Moore recalls:

In the words of Colin Irwin:

This was released as an album by Moore, but the four musicians soon thereafter formed Planxty in January 1972, to be managed by Des Kelly.

Planxty
After honing their live set at Slattery's, they played two concerts, afternoon and evening, at Newbridge College on Thursday, 16 March 1972. Donovan was in the audience and invited Planxty to open for him on his six-date Irish tour the following week, during which their first major performance—at the Hangar in Galway—was a huge success. Neither the audience nor the band knew what to expect, and both were pleasantly surprised. Irvine, unable to see the audience through the glare of the stage lights, was worried that the crowd might be on the verge of rioting. It took him several minutes to realise that what he was hearing was the expression of their enthusiastic response to the band's music. On 21 April 1972, Planxty embarked on their first tour of England, which had been booked previously by Moore, and played small folk clubs in Manchester, Bolton, Leeds, Hull, Barnsley, Blackpool, Newcastle, Chester and London, to great acclaim, returning to Ireland in May.

The group would go on to sign a six-record contract and to tour extensively throughout Europe. They played mostly traditional songs and tunes, but several were Irvine compositions, making him the lone composer of the band. Instrumentally the group was notable for the intricate bouzouki and mandolin counterpoint of Lunny and Irvine, along with O'Flynn's exceptional pipering; Irvine and Moore (who played guitar) were the principal vocalists. Very quickly, Lunny would also develop into their own in-house producer, arranger and musical director: "It very rapidly established itself that the music demanded to be treated on its own terms. It influenced our arrangements. [...] I think it was unfamiliar to people to hear traditional music with a chassis under it and it still sounds like traditional music."

Irvine contributed four songs to their first album, Planxty, recorded at the Command Studios in London during early September 1972 and released in early 1973:
"Arthur McBride", "West Coast of Clare", "The Jolly Beggar", and "The Blacksmith".

Their second album, The Well Below The Valley was recorded at Escape Studios in Kent, England, from 18 June 1973 until the end of the month, and released the same year. It features three songs by Irvine: "Pat Reilly", "As I Roved Out", and "Time Will Cure Me".

After the completion of this album, Planxty embarked on their first tour of Germany, where the group had become very popular. They also toured extensively in Ireland and were making more frequent trips abroad to festivals in Brittany and in England, at the Durham Folk Festival and the Cambridge Folk Festival. At the start of September 1973, Lunny resigned after playing his last gig with the band at the Edinburgh Festival. He was replaced by Johnny Moynihan.

Rehearsals for Planxty's third album, Cold Blow and the Rainy Night, began in the summer of 1974 at Moynihan's family summer home in Rush, on the north coast of County Dublin. At Irvine's behest, Lunny was co-opted back into the band to arrange the selected material and to play on the album, which was recorded in Sarm Studios, Whitechapel, London during August 1974 and released the same year. It includes four pieces by Irvine: "Johnny Cope", "Băneasă's Green Glade", "Mominsko Horo", and "The Green Fields of Canada".

After the completion of this third album, Moore resigned and was replaced by Strabane native Paul Brady. The band's new line-up (Irvine, O'Flynn, Moynihan, and Brady) toured extensively but released no recordings, breaking up after playing their final show in Brussels on 5 December 1975.

Duo with Paul Brady – Andy Irvine/Paul Brady
Irvine continued to tour with Brady, including a series of concerts in the USA in 1977 (Irvine's first ever visit there) highlighted by a very successful gig at the Town Hall in New York. Irvine was also invited by Alec Finn to join De Dannan after Dolores Keane had left, but he soon had to relinquish this new venture because of scheduling conflicts. Nonetheless, Irvine performed with De Dannan at 'The 3rd Irish Folk Festival' in Germany on 30 April 1976, playing "Martinmas Time/Danny O'Brien's Hornpipe", "Maíre Rua/Hardiman The Fiddler", "The Emigrant's Farewell", "The Boys of Ballysodare" and "The Plains of Kildare".

In August 1976, Irvine and Brady recorded an album together at the Rockfield Studios, Andy Irvine/Paul Brady, produced by Lunny who also plays on most tracks, and with Kevin Burke on fiddle; it was released in December 1976 by Mulligan Music Ltd. This album included "Autumn Gold", on which Irvine commented: "Written in Ljubljana in 1968, while sitting in a sunny park, stood up on a date. Waiting, as ever, for Vida." It is the final song of a quartet written during his sojourn in Eastern Europe during 1968–69, after spending several months in the Slovenian capital.

The 40th anniversary of the album's release was celebrated by a tour of Ireland scheduled for May 2017, featuring the original personnel: Irvine, Brady, Lunny and Burke. The tour visited: Cork, Dublin, Derry, Limerick, Galway and Belfast. During October 2018, the anniversary tour was repeated with one-night concerts in Dublin, Cork, London and Prague.

Duo with Mick Hanly – As I Went Over Blackwater
Irvine also toured extensively in Europe with Mick Hanly, including at 'The 4th Irish Folk Festival' in Germany on 30 April 1977. They started their set with Irvine performing a full version of "Johnny Cope": first the song, followed by the 6-part hornpipe of the same name, which Irvine played complete on bouzouki. Hanly then sang "A Kiss in the Morning Early". Irvine followed with "Bonny Woodhall", accompanying himself on Fylde 'Octavius' bouzouki (with the bottom two courses strung in octave). This recording of "Bonny Woodhall" is Irvine's interpretation of "Bonny Woodha (H476 in Sam Henry's Songs of the People) and would later appear as a bonus track on the CD version of Rainy Sundays... Windy Dreams. Their set ends with Hanly singing "John Barleycorn" and "The Verdant Braes of Skreen".

The following year, Irvine and Hanly were joined on stage by Liam O'Flynn at 'The 5th Irish Folk Festival' in Germany on 28 April 1978, playing "I Buried My Wife And Danced on Top of Her", a jig learnt from uilleann piper Willie Clancy; "Molly Bawn", sung by Hanly (with Irvine on hurdy-gurdy first, then on bouzouki); "Brian O'Lynn/Sean Bun"; "I Courted A Wee Girl"; "The Longford Weaver" sung by Irvine accompanying himself on hurdy-gurdy and harmonica; and "Masters Return/Kittie's Wedding".

Two years later, in 1980, Hanly released his second solo album As I Went Over Blackwater, featuring Irvine on four tracks: "Jack Haggerty" (harmonicas), "The Guerriere and The Constitution" (harmony vocals and hurdy-gurdy), "Every Circumstance" (mandolin) and "Miss Bailey/Jessica's Polka" (harmonica).

The Gathering
Sometime during 1977, Irvine also recorded The Gathering, along with Paul Brady, Dónal Lunny, Matt Molloy, Tommy Potts, Tríona Ní Dhomhnaill and uilleann piper Peter Browne. This album was funded by Diane Meek, a Guggenheim heiress who had used the pseudonym "Hamilton" as her maiden name to disguise her wealth. She was the owner of Tradition Records and a patron of traditional music in Dublin at the time. She had lent Mulligan Records money in the early days and had also formed a small record label for traditional music called Srutháin [a stream], on which she had intended to release The Gathering. However, the album was finally released in 1981 on Greenhays, a label connected with Rounder Records.

Irvine contributed two songs to the album: "There's Sure To Be A Row", and "The Mall of Lismore". He also plays mandolin and harmonica on Paul Brady's cover of "Heather on the Moor", a song learned from Eddie Butcher.

Paul Brady – Welcome Here Kind Stranger
On Friday 21 July 1978, Brady launched his album Welcome Here Kind Stranger with a concert in the auditorium of Liberty Hall in Dublin. He decided to record the concert on his own domestic Akai reel-to-reel tape machine with Brian Masterson in attendance, who had engineered the album and was doing the sound that night.

Performing with him were: Lunny, O'Flynn, Paddy Glackin, Matt Molloy, Noel Hill and Irvine, who played on nine of the ten numbers performed that night: "Paddy's Green Shamrock Shore" (harmonica, mandolin); "I Am A Youth That's Inclined To Ramble" (hurdy-gurdy); "The Creel/Out The Door And Over The Wall" (mandolin, bouzouki); "The Jolly Soldier/The Blarney Pilgrim" (harmonica, bouzouki); "Mary And The Soldier" (mandolin, harmonica); "Jackson And Jane" (hurdy-gurdy); "Don't Come Again" (mandolin); "The Lakes Of Pontchartrain" (bouzouki); "The Crooked Road To Dublin" (Portuguese guitarra with 8 tuners [4 removed], re-strung with 4 courses and tuned like a mandola).

After the concert, Brady took the tapes home and only found them again in November 2000, still in good enough condition to be transferred onto CD and released, in 2002, under the title The Missing Liberty Tapes.

Planxty – After The Break
By the autumn of 1978, Moore was ready to re-form the original Planxty line-up, complete with Lunny, who brought along flutist Matt Molloy from The Bothy Band, and rehearsals began on Tuesday, 19 September 1978. Their new manager, Kevin Flynn, then organised a mammoth European tour for the following year, from 15 April to 11 June 1979, during which the band played forty-seven concerts in fifty-eight days, in the UK, Germany, Switzerland, Belgium, France and Ireland.

After the tour, the band went to Windmill Lane Studios from 18 to 30 June 1979 to record their fourth album: After The Break, released the same year. Irvine contributed three pieces to the album: "You Rambling Boys of Pleasure", "The Rambling Siúler", and "Smeceno Horo".

After recording the album, Planxty resumed touring more sporadically, playing The National in Kilburn, a handful of dates in Belgium and France, and also headlining the third Ballisodare Festival. Molloy left Planxty to join The Chieftains in the autumn of 1979.

1980s: Solo album, Planxty, Parallel Lines, Mosaic, Patrick Street

Rainy Sundays... Windy Dreams
At the end of 1979, Irvine recorded his first solo album at Windmill Lane Studios in Dublin: Rainy Sundays... Windy Dreams, produced by Dónal Lunny and released on Tara Records in 1980. Personnel included Irvine, Lunny, O'Flynn, Brady (guitar and piano), Frankie Gavin (fiddle), Rick Epping (accordion, harmonica, jaw harp), John Wadham (bongo and congas), Paul Barrett (Fender Rhodes and Polymoog), Keith Donald (soprano sax) and Lucienne Purcell (vocals).

This first solo album showcased songs and tunes from two of his main influences: side one (on the vinyl LP) featured pieces inspired by Irish traditional music, and side two choices concentrated on Balkan music. The original, vinyl album closed with the self-penned "Rainy Sundays", a nostalgic song reminiscing about Vida, with whom Irvine pursued "a one-sided romance in Ljubljana years ago."

High Kings of Tara
In 1980, Tara Records released High Kings of Tara, a compilation album showcasing tracks previously released by some of its artists: Shaun Davey, Oisín, Jolyon Jackson, Paddy Glackin, Paddy Keenan, Stockton's Wing and Christy Moore.

This album also included five previously unreleased tracks by Planxty, Irvine and Moore. Two of these, Irvine's "The Bonny Light Horseman" and a set of reels by Planxty, "Lord McDonald/The Chattering Magpie", were subsequently added to the CD version of After The Break. The remaining three tracks were: "General Monroe" – a traditional song re-arranged by Irvine (bouzouki, harmonica) in duet with Lunny (guitar); "First Slip/Hardyman The Fiddler A&B/The Yellow Wattle" – a set of jigs by Planxty, including Matt Molloy; and "John of Dreams" – a ballad by Moore, which was later re-released on the CD version of The Iron Behind the Velvet.

Planxty – The Woman I loved So Well
On 28 February 1980, Planxty headlined the Sense of Ireland concert at the Royal Albert Hall in London. When they returned to Ireland, they recorded two programmes for RTÉ at the Pavilion Theatre in Dún Laoghaire, then started rehearsals at Kilkea Castle in Castledermot, County Kildare with two musicians from County Clare: concertina player Noel Hill and fiddler Tony Linnane. This six-member formation of Moore, Irvine, Lunny, O'Flynn, Hill and Linnane were joined by Matt Molloy and keyboardist Bill Whelan, to record the band's fifth album, The Woman I Loved So Well, at Windmill Lane Studios over two periods: 23–29 April and 16–19 May. The album was wrapped up with a reception at Windmill Lane Studios on 9 June and released on Tara Records in July 1980. Irvine contributed three songs to the album: "Roger O'Hehir", "Kellswater", and "Johnny of Brady's Lea".

Planxty then resumed touring as a four-piece again during the summer of 1980, playing a tour of Italian castles in July and returning to The Boys of Ballisodare festival on 9 August, where they were joined by Whelan and a young Cork fiddler, Nollaig Casey. Shows around this time would feature the quartet for the first set, with Whelan and Casey joining in for the second set. This sextet played a week of shows at the Olympia Theatre in Dublin on 18–23 August 1980, which was recorded for a potential live album that eventually emerged in 1987 as the unlicensed release The Best of Planxty Live. The same sextet also played a series of one-off events, including at the Hammersmith Odeon in March 1981, and recorded a suite called "Timedance"—with full orchestra and rhythm section—which was also performed during the interval of the Eurovision Song Contest, held in Dublin on 4 April 1981. "Timedance" was the genesis of what Whelan would later compose for Riverdance.

Parallel Lines with Dick Gaughan
In his online autobiography, Irvine recalls:

In August 1981, Irvine and Gaughan recorded Parallel Lines at Günter Pauler's Tonstudio in St Blasien/Herrenhaus, Northeim, Germany, released in 1982 on the German FolkFreak-Platten label. It was produced by Gaughan, Irvine and Carsten Linde, with a line-up including Gaughan (acoustic and electric guitars, bass guitar and vocal), Irvine (bouzouki, mandola, mandolin, harmonica, hurdy-gurdy and vocal), Nollaig Casey (fiddle), Martin Buschmann (saxophone), Judith Jaenicke (flute) and Bob Lenox (Fender Rhodes piano). Dónal Lunny also overdubbed the fiddle parts and remixed the album at Lombard Studios in Dublin.

In 1997, Parallel Lines was re-issued on CD, including "Thousands Are Sailing" as a bonus track that Irvine and Gaughan had recorded during the above-mentioned Folk Friends 2 recording sessions, held in 1980.

About the recording of Parallel Lines, Irvine would later comment:

Irvine and Gaughan did, however, perform live at Whelan's venue in Dublin on Wednesday 2 February 2011, nearly thirty years after recording Parallel Lines.

Planxty – Words and Music
The Planxty sextet continued to tour, but began to drift apart. In 1980, O'Flynn recorded The Brendan Voyage with Shaun Davey. Moore and Lunny, eager to experiment with a rhythm section and a different, more political song set, formed Moving Hearts in 1981. Lunny also kept busy producing albums by other artists. As a result of all these parallel projects, the original quartet would end up playing their last show together on 24 August 1982, at the National Stadium in Dublin.

Nevertheless, Planxty—with Whelan and Casey still on board—reconvened at Windmill Lane Studios in late October and early November 1982, to record Words & Music, which also featured fiddler James Kelly and Moving Hearts bass guitarist Eoghan O'Neill. It was released on the WEA label in 1983. Irvine contributed three pieces to the album: "Thousands Are Sailing", "Accidentals", and "Aragon Mill".

A final line-up that Irvine dubbed "Planxty-Too-Far"—Irvine, O'Flynn, Whelan, Arty McGlynn on guitar, James Kelly on fiddle and singer Dolores Keane, but without Casey—undertook a UK tour on Friday, 1 April 1983, followed by a series of live engagements in Ireland, an appearance on the Late Late Show and some eight shows, including the National Stadium in Dublin on 27 April 1983. Two days later, Irvine went on tour in the Balkans and, on his return in mid-June, found that: "to my surprise, the band hadn't actually split up, it has just fallen asunder. An unfortunate ending to the second coming...".

After Planxty
Irvine resumed his solo career, playing occasionally with McGlynn and Casey, and also travelled to Hungary, where he played and fraternised with local musicians:

The singer from Muzsikás, Márta Sebestyén, would soon thereafter be joining Irvine's next multicultural folk group: Mosaic. He also met multi-instrumentalist Nikola Parov (Sebestyén's then husband), who would go on to participate in several of Irvine's projects, the first being the album East Wind (1992), which featured Sebestyén. Irvine would later write a song about this period of his life in Budapest: "The Wind Blows Over The Danube", released on the album Changing Trains.

Mosaic
In the winter of 1984, Irvine gathered a collection of musicians from throughout Europe and formed Mosaic, with a line-up including Irvine, Dónal Lunny along with his former Moving Hearts associate, uilleann piper Declan Masterson, Danish bassist and singer Lissa Ladefoged, Dutch guitarist and singer Hans Theessink, and singer Márta Sebestyén.

Their first public gig was in Budapest on 12 July 1985, followed by a further two gigs in Hungary and an appearance at the Dranouter festival in Belgium in early August, prior to their English tour. Their seventh gig was billed at the Southport Arts Center, which Chris Hardwick of Folk Roots reviewed with the following introduction: "Every once in a while the folk scene throws up a new permutation in which exceptionally gifted individuals come together to produce something so innovative and exhilarating that it goes way beyond the sum of the parts".

Their set included: Stan Rogers's "Northwest Passage", an unspecified Macedonian dance tune ("one of Andy's 90 mph specials"), a solo Hungarian love song from Sebestyén, a brooding cover of Eric Von Schmidt's Caribbean lament "Joshua Gone Barbados" from Theessink, the Irish three (Irvine, Lunny and Masterson) on a set of reels including "The Spike Island Lasses", and Irvine singing Andy Mitchell's "Indiana". However, the band lasted only that one summer.

A couple of years later, Irvine stated that he would have liked to try the experiment again by concentrating on the Irish and East European sound without bringing in the blues influence.

Patrick Street
Also in 1985, Irvine joined up with fiddler Kevin Burke and guitarist Mícheál Ó Domhnaill (who had been gigging together around America for some time) and toured as a trio in the USA; when Ó Domhnaill wasn't available for some of the dates, guitarist/vocalist Gerry O'Beirne stepped in.
"This tour was such fun and so successful that we decided to expand the outfit into a four-piece by adding Jackie Daly", Irvine wrote.

Initially billed on a 1986 American tour as "The Legends of Irish Music", they soon chose to call themselves Patrick Street. The line-up for the band underwent several changes, but always included Irvine, Burke, and Daly. The guitar role, however, passed:
from O'Beirne to Arty McGlynn – before the recording of their first album, Patrick Street, which began in August 1986;
from McGlynn to Ged Foley – after the band recorded their fourth album, All in Good Time, released in 1993;
back to McGlynn – when they resumed touring after the completion of their ninth album, On the Fly, released in 2007.

After Jackie Daly retired from Patrick Street, John Carty joined on fiddle, flute and tenor banjo in time to record On The Fly.

Originally agreed to as a part-time band, they have nevertheless recorded eight studio albums together, plus one live album (Live from Patrick Street) and two compilations (The Best of Patrick Street and Compendium: The Best of Patrick Street).

On their first album, Patrick Street, released in 1986, Irvine sings four songs: "Patrick Street", "The Holy Ground", "The Dream/Indiana", and "The Man with the Cap".

No. 2 Patrick Street, released in 1988, again features four songs sung by Irvine: "Tom Joad"; "Facing the Chair"; "Braes of Moneymore", to which Irvine changed the tune and added a verse; and "William Taylor"

Their third album, Irish Times, released in 1990, includes three songs by Irvine: "Brackagh Hill"; "Forgotten Hero", his composition about Michael Davitt; and "The Humours of the King of Ballyhooley".

Playing style – The Irish Bouzouki
In 1989, Irvine's style of playing the bouzouki was summarised thus in The Irish Bouzouki, an instructional guide:

The tutor also provided simple standard notation scores and lyrics for two of Irvine's songs: "Brackagh Hill" (which he recorded with Patrick Street on the album Irish Times released the same year) and "Bridget", a song written by Jane Cassidy which he never released elsewhere. The cassette accompanying this tutor provided both songs, with Irvine accompanying himself on bouzouki. In the same tutor, Irvine's Irish bouzouki tuning (GDAD', one octave lower than the open-tuned mandolin) was also contrasted with the traditional Greek bouzouki tuning (CFAD').

In a 1985 interview with the American Frets magazine, Irvine had explained the origins of his bouzouki tuning:

1990s: Solo albums, East Wind, Patrick Street

Rude Awakening
In December 1990 and January 1991, Irvine recorded his second solo album, Rude Awakening, produced by Bill Whelan. The line-up included Whelan (keyboards), Rens van der Zalm (fiddle, mandolin, guitar), Carl Geraghty (soprano saxophone), Arty McGlynn (guitar), Davy Spillane (whistle) and Fionnuala Sherry (fiddle). The album was released on Green Linnet Records, later in 1991.

It features "Never Tire of the Road", Irvine's tribute song to Woody Guthrie, alongside mainly self-penned material celebrating some of his other heroes: Raoul Wallenberg, James Connolly, Emiliano Zapata, Michael Dwyer, Douglas Mawson, Aeneas Mackintosh and Sinclair Lewis. The only other traditional song is "Allan McLean". The sleeve notes of "Love To Be With You" show a faded, black & white photo of Vida, the heroine of his song from ten years earlier: "Rainy Sundays".

East Wind
Irvine had also played some Balkan tunes to Whelan and mentioned his aspiration to record them. So, shortly thereafter, he was rehearsing again with Davy Spillane (uilleann pipes and low whistle) to record East Wind, a collection of Bulgarian and Macedonian tunes played Irish-style and produced by Whelan, who also contributed keyboards and piano.

The project influenced Riverdance:

The extensive line-up included Nikola Parov on Bulgarian instruments (gadulka, kaval, gaida) & bouzouki, Máirtín O'Connor (accordion), Noel Eccles & Paul Moran (percussion), Tony Molloy (bass), Carl Geraghty & Kenneth Edge (saxophones), John Sheahan (fiddle), Anthony Drennan (guitar), Mícheál Ó Súilleabháin (piano), Márta Sebestyén (vocals) and Rita Connolly (backing vocals).

In an interview with Folk Roots in August 1992, Irvine stated: "We finished it eighteen months ago but [...] John Cook at Tara wanted to try the avenue of big companies." The album was eventually released on the Tara label itself in mid-1992.

For a while, Irvine and Parov were joined by Rens van der Zalm and toured together in Europe as the 'East Wind Trio', and then again in the US during 1996.

Patrick Street – All in Good Time
Irvine contributed six pieces to Patrick Street's fourth album, All in Good Time, released in 1993: "A Prince Among Men (Only a Miner)"; Lintheads, a trilogy comprising: "The Pride of the Springfield Road", "Lawrence Common", and "Goodbye, Monday Blues"; "Carrowclare"; and "The Girls Along the Road".

Patrick Street – Cornerboys
Patrick Street's fifth album, Cornerboys, was released in 1996 and includes seven pieces provided by Irvine: "Sweet Lisbweemore"; "Morlough Shore"; Pity the Poor Hare (a suite comprising: "On Yonder Hill", "Merrily Tripping O'er The Plain", "The Kilgrain Hare", and "Pity the Poor Hare"); and "Down By Greer's Grove".

Rain on the Roof
Recorded in June, July and August 1996, Irvine's third solo album, Rain on the Roof, is the closest the listener could get to the experience of attending one of his gigs. It was the first release (product number "AK-1") on his own label, Andy Irvine. The album mixes some of Irvine's compositions with traditional songs and Bulgarian tunes. As he explains in the sleeve notes:

Other instruments were added (on four of the eleven tracks) by Rens van der Zalm (fiddle and mandolin), Stephen Cooney (didgeridoo, Kpanlogo drum), Declan Masterson (low whistle) and Irvine himself, who played a second mandolin on two of the tracks.

Patrick Street – Made in Cork
Patrick Street's sixth album, Made in Cork, was released in 1997, to which Irvine contributed four songs: "Her Mantle So Green", "Rainbow 'Mid The Willows", "Spanking Maggie from the Ross", and "When Adam Was in Paradise", another song he learned from the singing of Eddie Butcher.

Patrick Street – Live from Patrick Street
Live from Patrick Street, released in 1999, was Patrick Street's seventh album, recorded during a tour of Ireland and Britain in November 1998. It features five of Irvine's songs: "Braes of Moneymore", Eddie Butcher's "My Son in Amerikay", "Wild Rover No More", "Stewball and the Monaghan Grey Mare", and "The Holy Ground".

2000s: Solo album, Mozaik, Patrick Street, Planxty, Marianne Green

Way Out Yonder
In 2000, Irvine released his fourth solo album, Way Out Yonder, recorded between July and December 1999 and co-produced with Steve Cooney.

Irvine was joined by Rens van der Zalm (guitar, fiddle, mandolin, Bulgarian tambura and bass guitar), Lindsey Horner (double bass), Máire Breatnach (viola), Cormac Breatnach (low whistle), Steve Cooney (Spanish guitar, percussion and kalimba), Declan Masterson (uilleann pipes and low whistle), Liam O'Flynn (uilleann pipes and tin whistle), Nikola Parov (gadulka), Brendan Power (harmonica), plus Lynn Kavanagh, Mandy Murphy and Phil Callery (backing vocals).

Mozaik – Live from the Powerhouse
On 1 March 2002, the seaside town of Rye, Victoria in Australia witnessed the formation and six-day marathon rehearsals of multicultural group Mozaik—not to be confused with his earlier, similarly named group Mosaic—featuring Irvine, Dónal Lunny, Bruce Molsky, Nikola Parov and Rens van der Zalm.

The Australian tour that followed culminated in two gigs recorded at the Brisbane Powerhouse on 30/31 March and released on the album Live from the Powerhouse in 2004, under license to Compass Records.

Patrick Street – Street Life
Patrick Street's eighth album, Street Life, was released in 2002. Irvine contributed four pieces: "Barna Hill", "Down in Matewan", "Lost Indian", and "Green Grows the Laurel".

Planxty ("The Third Coming") – Live 2004
In late 2002, broadcaster and journalist Leagues O'Toole was working as presenter and researcher for the RTÉ television show No Disco and persuaded the programme editor, Rory Cobbe, to develop a one-off documentary about Planxty.

O'Toole proceeded with interviewing Moore, Irvine and O'Flynn but Lunny, who was living in Japan, was unavailable. After also shooting links at key landmarks from the Planxty history, the programme aired on 3 March 2003, receiving a phenomenal response from the public and some very positive feedback from the Planxty members themselves. In a final comment about the constant speculation of the original line-up regrouping, Moore had stated, on camera: "There's nobody longs for it more than myself and the other three guys. Definitely the time is right. Let's go for it".

A few months later, Paddy Doherty, owner of the Royal Spa Hotel in Lisdoonvarna (and co-founder of the Lisdoonvarna Festival), arranged for the band's use of the hotel's old dining room for rehearsals, which led to a one-off concert there in front of 200 people on 11 October 2003. Moore, on stage, credited the No Disco documentary with inspiring the reunion.

Pleased with the results and the experience of playing together again, the original Planxty quartet agreed to the longed-for reunion (dubbed "The Third Coming") and would perform together again, on and off, for a period of just over a year.

Planxty first played a series of concerts at the Glór Theatre in Ennis, County Clare (on 23 & 24 January 2004) and at Vicar Street in Dublin (on 30 & 31 January and on 4 & 5, 11 & 12 February 2004), which were recorded and from which selected material was released on the CD Live 2004 and its associated DVD.

In late 2004 and early 2005, another round of concerts took place at the following venues:

 Radisson SAS Hotel in Galway (6, 7 and 8 October 2004); 
 Point Theatre in Dublin (28, 29 and 30 December 2004, plus extra dates on 3, 4 and 5 January 2005);
 Waterfront Hall in Belfast (19, 20 and 21 January 2005);
 Barbican Centre in London (29, 30 and 31 January 2005).

Since then, the original Planxty quartet have neither performed live nor recorded new material together.

Solo version of "As I Roved Out"
In May 2005, Irvine wrote in his website journal: "Also premiered "As I Roved Out" with my own accompaniment. It's always been a Planxty number till now with Dónal playing Baritone Guitar and me just singing it." A recording of this version of "As I Roved Out" was eventually released on Peter Ratzenbeck's album Resonances in 2007, where Irvine appeared as a guest and played it solo on his "Stefan Sobell mandola, tuned CGDG (Capo 0)".

Mozaik – Changing Trains
In January and April 2005, Mozaik rehearsed new material for Changing Trains, their first studio album recorded in Budapest during November of the same year.

This album was initially released by the band in Australia in 2006 and, after additional re-mixing by Lunny at Longbeard Studios in Dublin, was re-released in the autumn of 2007 under license to Compass Records.

Patrick Street – On the Fly
Patrick Street's ninth album, On the Fly, was released in 2007. Irvine provided three songs: "Sergeant Small", "The Rich Irish Lady", and "Erin Go Bragh".

Marianne Green – Dear Irish Boy
Irvine arranged and produced Marianne Green's debut album, Dear Irish Boy, released in 2009. Personnel included: Marianne Green (vocals), Irvine (bouzouki, mandolin, mandola, bass-bouzouki, harmonica), Colum Sands (double bass, concertina) and Gerry O'Conner (violin).

The tracks are: "The Banks of the Bann" (trad.), "You Make Me Fly" (M. Green), "Tá Mé 'Mo Shuí" (trad.), "The Doffin Mistress" (trad.), "Bonny Portmore" (trad.), "Ar A Ghabháil Go Baile Átha Cliath Damh" (trad.), "Cian's Song" (M. O'Hare), "The Dear Irish Boy" (trad.), "The Wife's Lamentation" (M. Green), "The Road To Dundee" (trad.), "The Wreck of the Newcastle Fishermen" (trad.) and "Carrickmannon Lake" (trad.).

2010s: Solo albums, LAPD, duo with Rens van der Zalm, Usher's Island

Abocurragh
In August 2010, Irvine released his fifth solo album: Abocurragh, recorded in Dublin, Norway, Australia, Hungary and Brittany between February 2009 and April 2010 and produced by Dónal Lunny, who also plays on all but one of the tracks.

They were joined by Liam O'Flynn (uilleann pipes, tin whistle), Nikola Parov (kaval, nyckelharpa), Máirtín O'Connor (accordion), Bruce Molsky (fiddle), Rens van der Zalm (fiddle), Rick Epping (harmonica), Paul Moore (double bass), Graham Henderson (keyboards), Liam Bradley (percussion), Jacky Molard (violas, violins and string arrangement), Annbjørg Lien (hardanger fiddles), Lillebjørn Nilsen (guitar), plus Kate Burke and Ruth Hazleton (backing vocals).

LAPD (Liam/Andy/Paddy/Dónal)

Friday, 20 January 2012 ushered in the inaugural gig, at Dublin's Vicar Street, of a quartet named 'LAPD' after the initials of its members' first names: Liam O'Flynn, Andy Irvine, Paddy Glackin, and Dónal Lunny.

They played a set combining tunes and songs from the repertoires of:
 Planxty: "Jenny's Wedding/The Virginia/Garrett Barry's", "Paddy Canny's" ("The Starting Gate"), "The Jolly Beggar/The Wise Maid", "Arthur MacBride", "As I Roved Out (Andy)", "The Blacksmith" and "West Coast of Clare";
 Irvine & Lunny: "My Heart's tonight in Ireland/West Clare Reel", "Braes of Moneymore", "Suleiman's Kopanitsa", "The Dream/Indiana", "O'Donoghue's" and "Siún Ni Dhuibhir";
 O'Flynn & Glackin: "Kitty's Rambles/Humours of Ennistymon", "The Green Island/Bantry Hornpipe", "Young Tom Ennis/Nora Crean", "A Rainy Day/The Shaskeen", "Two Flings", "Speed the Plough/Colonel Fraser" and "The Gold Ring".

LAPD performed only occasionally, to rave reviews, but never recorded before disbanding; their last performance took place at Sligo Live, on Saturday, 26 October 2013.

70th Birthday Concert at Vicar St 2012
On 16 and 17 June 2012, Irvine's 70th birthday was celebrated at Dublin's Vicar Street venue in a pair of concerts. He was joined onstage by Paul Brady and various combinations of members of Sweeney's Men, Planxty, Mozaik and LAPD, plus brothers George and Manoli Galiatsos who came unexpectedly all the way from Athens for the concerts, which were recorded and released on the CD Andy Irvine/70th Birthday Concert at Vicar St 2012 and its associated DVD.

Playing Woody Guthrie again
A week later, Irvine was invited to participate with Billy Bragg in the Woody 100 Legacy Show scheduled at Dublin's Vicar Street on Monday, 17 September 2012, to celebrate Woody Guthrie's Centenary.

In his web journal, Irvine wrote at the time: "I recently located my old Gibson L0 guitar. It was in the shed where it has been languishing for some years. I used to be able to do a pretty good impression of Woody's 'Church lick' guitar playing. Hope I can get it all back! [...] I'd better get practising!..."

Parachilna with Rens van der Zalm
On 13 November 2013, Irvine released his first duo album with Rens van der Zalm: Parachilna, an album of Irish and Australian songs recorded live in July 2012 while camping in Parachilna, South Australia and New South Wales.

It was co-produced by Irvine (vocals, bouzouki, mandola and harmonica) and van der Zalm (backing vocals, guitar, mandolin, fiddle and viola), and recorded by Cian Burke in disused buildings using top-quality microphones, a laptop and Pro Tools. Most of the time, there are only two instruments playing–three when Irvine also plays harmonica–and the resulting sound is bright and pristine.

Usher's Island
On 27 January 2015, Irvine launched his latest musical association at Celtic Connections in Glasgow: a band called Usher's Island (a reference to the Dublin quay), with Dónal Lunny (guitar, bouzouki, bodhrán, keyboards), Paddy Glackin (fiddle), Michael McGoldrick (uilleann pipes, flute and whistle), and John Doyle (guitar).

Selected discography

Solo
 Rainy Sundays... Windy Dreams (1980)
 Rude Awakening (1991)
 Rain on the Roof (1996)
 Way Out Yonder (2000)
 Abocurragh (2010)
 Old Dog Long Road – Vol.1 (1961–2012) (2019) – 2 discs
 Old Dog Long Road – Vol.2 (1961–2015) (2020) – 2 discs
With Christy Moore
 Prosperous (1971)
 Christy Moore (1976)
 The Iron Behind the Velvet (1978)
 Ordinary Man (1985)
With Paul Brady
 Andy Irvine/Paul Brady (1976)
 Welcome Here Kind Stranger (1978) 
 The Missing Liberty Tapes (2002)
With Maddy Prior & June Tabor
 Silly Sisters (1976)
With Mick Hanly
 As I Went Over Blackwater (1980)
With various artists
 The Gathering (1981)
With Dick Gaughan
 Parallel Lines (1982)
With Peter Ratzenbeck
 Over the Years (1990)
 Outremer (1995)
 Travelogue (1997)
 Resonances (2007)
With Davy Spillane
 East Wind (1992)
With Marianne Green
 Dear Irish Boy (2009)
With Rens van der Zalm
 Parachilna (2013)
With Luke Plumb
 Precious Heroes (2017)

With Sweeney's Men
 Sweeney's Men (1968)
With Planxty
 Planxty (1973)
 The Well Below the Valley (1973)
 Cold Blow and the Rainy Night (1974)
 After The Break (1979)
 High Kings of Tara (1980) – Planxty & various artists
 The Woman I Loved So Well (1980)
 Live at Olympia Theatre, Dublin (1980) – Cassette; withdrawn shortly after release
 Words & Music (1983)
 Arís! (1984)
 Live 2004 (2004) – Separate CD and DVD 
 Between the Jigs and the Reels: A Retrospective (2016) – CD and DVD combo
 One Night in Bremen (2018)
With Patrick Street
 Patrick Street (1986)
 No. 2 Patrick Street (1988)
 Irish Times (1990)
 All in Good Time (1993)
 The Best of Patrick Street (1995)
 Cornerboys (1996)
 Made in Cork (1997)
 Live from Patrick Street (1999)
 Compendium: The Best of Patrick Street (2000)
 Street Life (2002)
 On the Fly (2007)
With Mozaik
 Live from the Powerhouse (2004)
 Changing Trains (2007)
 The Long And The Short Of It (2019)
With Sweeney's Men, Mozaik, Paul Brady, LAPD
 Andy Irvine/70th Birthday Concert at Vicar St 2012 (2014) – Separate CD and DVD
With Usher's Island
 Usher's Island (2017)
With Lillebjørn Nilsen
 Live In Telemark (2021)

Filmography
 Planxty Live 2004 (2004), DVD
 Come West Along The Road/Irish Traditional Music Treasures From RTÉ Archives 1960s – 1980s (2005), DVD
 Come West Along The Road 2/Irish Traditional Music Treasures From RTÉ Archives 1960s – 1980s (2007), DVD
 From Clare To Here (2008), DVD
 Come West Along The Road 3/Irish Traditional Music Treasures From RTÉ Archives 1960s – 1980s (2010), DVD
 Come West Along The Road/The Collection (2014), DVD (Volumes 1–4 Boxset)
 Ar Stáitse – RTÉ TV Series, DVD 
 The Transatlantic Sessions Series 6 (2014), DVD
 Andy Irvine 70th Birthday Concert at Vicar St 2012 (2014), DVD
 Mozaik on Tour 2014 (2014), YouTube video clip
 Planxty Between the Jigs and the Reels: A Retrospective (2016), DVD

Selected early acting performances
The following table shows a selection of acting roles and performances by Andrew Irvine, between 1950 and 1964.

Awards
 2018: Won the first Lifetime Achievement Award bestowed at RTÉ Radio 1's inaugural Folk Music Awards.

Bibliography
 
 
 
 
 
 
 
 
 
 
 
 Planxty (Songbook; 1973), London: Mews Music.

See also
 Eddie Butcher
 List of Irish theatres and theatre companies
 Sam Henry

Notes

References

External links

 
 
 
 
 
 

1942 births
Living people
English male singer-songwriters
English folk singers
English people of Irish descent
English people of Scottish descent
Irish folk singers
Irish mandolinists
Irish bouzouki players
Irish harmonica players
Irish people of Scottish descent
Hurdy-gurdy players
Industrial Workers of the World members
People from St John's Wood
Mozaik members
Patrick Street members
Planxty members
Sweeney's Men members
Usher's Island (band) members
De Dannan members
Green Linnet Records artists